Samsung S5560i is an improved version of S5560 (Marvel). It has a 3.0 inches capacitive touchscreen and 16M colors.
The phone is available in black and pearl white versions. It has an improved camera and lens, an improved screen, battery and  improved interface than previous model S5560 (Marvel).

S5560i
Mobile phones introduced in 2011